Anatomy of a Marriage: My Days with Jean-Marc (Françoise ou La vie conjugale) is a 1964 French film directed by André Cayatte telling the story of a marriage break-up told from the woman's point of view.

The film's companion piece Anatomy of a Marriage: My Days with Françoise tells the story from the man's point of view.

Cast 
Jacques Charrier as Jean-Marc
Marie-José Nat as Françoise
Michel Subor as Roger
Macha Méril as Nicole
Alfred Adam as Fernand Aubry
Giani Esposito as Ettore
Jacques Monod as Rouquier
Yves Vincent as Granjouan
Blanchette Brunoy as Mme Aubry
Jacqueline Porel as Line
Jean-Henri Chambois as The president
Rosita Fernández as The maid
 as Mme Monier
Yvan Chiffre as Christian
Corinne Armand as Christine
Julien Verdier as The doorman
Henri Crémieux as Rancoule
Michel Tureau as Milou
Marie-Claude Breton as Minouche
Michèle Girardon as Patricia
Georges Rivière as Philippe

Reception 
In a joint review of the two films, Bosley Crowther of The New York Times wrote that the two main actors "skillfully [portrayed] the characteristics of nobility and selflessness or pettiness and shame" but that "the two main characters in these films are distinctly commonplace people, inadequate to responsibility, immature and hardly worth the exceptional attention that is given to them".

References

External links 

1964 films
Films directed by André Cayatte
1964 drama films
1960s French-language films
French black-and-white films
1960s French films